Josef Moc (January 22, 1908, Mladá Boleslav – 13 July 1999, Prague) was a Czechoslovak basketball player who competed for Czechoslovakia in the 1936 Summer Olympics.

In 1936 he was a member of the Czechoslovak basketball team, which was eliminated in the third round of the Olympic tournament. He played one match.

References

External links
part 7 the basketball tournament
Josef Moc's profile at Sports Reference.com

1908 births
1999 deaths
Czechoslovak men's basketball players
Olympic basketball players of Czechoslovakia
Basketball players at the 1936 Summer Olympics